Kadamaian Waterfall is a cascading waterfall approximately  high on the southern flank of the Mount Kinabalu. It is the longest waterfall in Malaysia and can be seen from the Tamparuli-Ranau road. However it is not easily accessible.

Mount Kinabalu
Waterfalls of Malaysia
Landforms of Sabah